XHHV-FM is a radio station on 94.1 FM in Boca del Río, Veracruz. It is owned by Grupo Pazos Radio and carries a grupera format known as La Fiera.

History
XEHV-AM 1310 began broadcasting on April 2, 1940. It was owned by Juan A. Palavicini and broadcast with 1,000 watts. Miguel Núñez Carrillo owned the station from 1954 to 1966. In the 1990s, it raised its power to 2,500 watts during the day.

In 2010, XEHV was cleared for AM-FM migration.

References

Radio stations in Veracruz
Radio stations established in 1940